Saint Johns Creek is a stream in Franklin County in the U.S. state of Missouri. It is a tributary of the Missouri River.

 
Saint Johns Creek most likely derives its name from an English translation of Fort San Juan del Misuri, a Spanish fort along its course.

See also
List of rivers of Missouri

References

Rivers of Franklin County, Missouri
Rivers of Missouri